Oneida is an unincorporated community and census-designated place (CDP) in Clay County, Kentucky, United States. Its population was 410 at the 2010 census. It is the home of Oneida Baptist Institute. Goose Creek, the Red Bird River, and Bullskin Creek confluence to form the South Fork of the Kentucky River a few hundred yards from the center of the town.

The major road that leads from the center of town to the Leslie County line is called "Bullskin".

Demographics

Notable people
Jensen Huang Co-Founder and CEO of Nvidia

Climate
The climate in this area is characterized by hot, humid summers and generally mild to cool winters.  According to the Köppen Climate Classification system, Oneida has a humid subtropical climate, abbreviated "Cfa" on climate maps.

References

External links

Census-designated places in Clay County, Kentucky
Unincorporated communities in Clay County, Kentucky
Unincorporated communities in Kentucky
Census-designated places in Kentucky